Bliss is an opera in three acts by Brett Dean to a libretto by Amanda Holden. The libretto is based on Peter Carey's novel Bliss, which had earlier been made into the 1985 film Bliss. The opera premiered at the Sydney Opera House on 12 March 2010 and has subsequently been performed in the United Kingdom and Germany. A performance of the work lasts for about two hours and forty minutes.

Development
The development of this work suffered several setbacks over the years. Simone Young was musical director of Opera Australia when it commissioned Brett Dean and Amanda Holden to write this work. Soon after, Young left Opera Australia and took up the position of artistic director (Intendant) of the Hamburg State Opera. Her successor, Richard Hickox, also supported the work; but he died in 2008. Then, the Australian National Academy of Music, of which Dean was the Artistic Director, was threatened with the loss of its funding from the Australian federal government.

During the development of the opera, Dean wrote the orchestral piece Moments of Bliss, which premiered on 2 December 2004 at Hamer Hall, Melbourne, with the Melbourne Symphony Orchestra under Markus Stenz. Dean composed the role of Harry Joy specifically for Peter Coleman-Wright; three of this role's arias were sung by Coleman-Wright in a concert on 2 October 2008 under the title Songs of Joy with the Royal Liverpool Philharmonic conducted by Simon Rattle.

Performance history
The opera premiered by Opera Australia at the Sydney Opera House on 12 March 2010. It then travelled to the Edinburgh International Festival and opened the 2010/11 season at the Hamburg State Opera.

The premiere of Bliss was accompanied with various programs on the ABC. On 13 March 2010 ABC2 showed a director's cut of the film Bliss, introduced by an interview of the film's director Ray Lawrence by David Stratton. ABC1 showed a documentary on 16 March 2010, Artscape – Making Opera Bliss and the opera's second performance on 17 March 2010 was broadcast live by ABC2 and shown on Melbourne's Federation Square and in cinemas throughout Australia.

Opera Australia's recording of the opera was nominated for the ARIA Award for Best Original Soundtrack, Cast or Show Album in 2015.

Setting
The opera is set in Brisbane in the early 1980s.

Roles

References

External links
Interview about Bliss with Peter Coleman-Wright by Andrew Ford at Radio National
"A Joy in hell as Bliss hits the stage" by Matthew Perkins, 702 ABC Sydney (11 March 2010), includes audio sample and production photographs
"Blissful performances on anti-hero's journey", review by Peter McCallum, The Sydney Morning Herald (15 March 2010)
 

2010 operas
English-language operas
Operas based on novels
Operas set in Australia
Opera world premieres at Sydney Opera House
Operas
Compositions by Brett Dean